Anemonastrum obtusilobum (syn. Anemone obtusiloba), the round-leaved anemone, is a species of flowering plant in the family Ranunculaceae, native to mountainous regions of Pakistan, Myanmar, Nepal and western China (Tibet), and also cultivated as an ornamental.

The flowers consist of 4-7 rounded petals surrounding a prominent yellow central boss, and appear in spring to early summer. The plant is reasonably hardy, but requires a sheltered spot in full sun or partial shade. It is suitable as an underplanting for deciduous trees or shrubs.

References

obtusilobum
Flora of Pakistan
Flora of Nepal
Flora of Myanmar
Flora of Tibet